Daniel Jay Hegeman (born March 4, 1963) is a Republican member of the Missouri Senate, representing the 12th district, which covers parts of northwestern Missouri. He was first elected unopposed in 2014.

Hegeman previously served as president of the Andrew County Farm Bureau, member of the Nodaway County Economic Development Board, and member of the Maryville and Savannah Chambers of Commerce. He also served in the Missouri House of Representatives from 1991 until 2003.

Electoral History

State Representative

State Senate

Personal life
Hegeman and his wife, Francine, have 4 children; Hannah, Joseph, Heidi, and Joshua. They reside in Cosby, Missouri.

Hegeman graduated from Savannah High School in 1981, and from the University of Missouri in 1985.

References

External links

 
 Campaign website
 Legislative website

1963 births
People from Andrew County, Missouri
Living people
University of Missouri alumni
Republican Party Missouri state senators
Republican Party members of the Missouri House of Representatives
21st-century American politicians
People from Nodaway County, Missouri
2020 United States presidential electors